Dominique (or Domingue) de Gourgues (1530–1593) was a French nobleman and soldier. He is best known for leading an attack against Spanish Florida in 1568, in response to the destruction of the French Fort Caroline. He was a captain in King Charles IX's army.

Youth
De Gourgue's early life is not well known. He came from the old and powerful family of Gourgue, one of the most important families of the French city of Bordeaux. He served in the Italian wars under Maréchal de Strozzi, was captured by Spaniards in 1557, and then by the Turks, and served several years in the galleys. After his return to France, he made a voyage to Brazil and the West Indies, and then entered the service of Duke de Guise, and was employed against the Huguenots.

Situation in the colonies

Philip II of Spain was a Roman Catholic king who hated Protestants, including the French Huguenots, and considered them heretics.  He ordered his troops to kill any they found in the colonies.  Therefore, in 1565, troops under Pedro Menéndez de Avilés notoriously massacred hundreds of Frenchmen around Fort Caroline in what is now Jacksonville, Florida.  After capturing the fort and slaying nearly all his prisoners, Menéndez hung their bodies on trees, with the inscription, "Not as Frenchmen but as Lutherans."  The massacre aroused indignation in France among Protestants and Catholics alike.  The French king sent complaints to the Spanish court, but Menéndez and his associates, instead of being punished for the deed, received rewards and honors.

Revenge

Embittered by the cruelty and indignity that he had suffered from the Spaniards, de Gourgue determined to avenge the murder of his Protestant compatriots, though he was himself a Catholic. He sold everything he had and borrowed money from his brother Antoine to recruit a crew and charter three ships. He sailed to Cuba with two hundred men, never telling them the goal of their trip. Once in Cuba he made his intentions clear, and his crew approved his choice of revenge. Gourgue then moved to attack Spanish-held Fort Caroline, which they had renamed as Fort San Mateo, enlisting the aid of Fort Caroline's old allies, the Saturiwa and Tacatacuru clans of the Timucua Indians. The fort soon surrendered to de Gourgue's forces. The French and Indians killed the Spanish prisoners in retribution for Fort Caroline and other massacres of Protestants. They hanged the prisoners with the inscription, "Not as Spaniards but as murderers."

Later life
De Gourgue returned to the port of La Rochelle on 6 June 1568. He was received cordially by Monluc, governor of Bordeaux, but coldly by the court, which feared a rupture with Spain. For several years he lived in obscurity, almost in misery, at Rouen with the president of Marigny, until restored to the king's favor in 1572. He was given command of a vessel, and participated in the Siege of La Rochelle, commanding the largest vessel of the squadron. In 1592 Don Antonio de Crato appointed him commander of the fleet for a campaign for the crown of Portugal against Philip II. While on the journey, de Gourgue died.

References

Sources

English

French
 Extraits de l'histoire coloniale de la Floride et de la Louisiane
 Lhoumeau, Hélène. Les expéditions françaises en Floride (1562-1568)
 Document de la main de Gourgues
 Guerin, Léon. Les navigateurs Français, 1847 
p. 180
 Weiss, Charles. Histoire des réfigiés protestants de France, 1853.

1530 births
1593 deaths
People of Spanish Florida
French North America
History of Jacksonville, Florida
Huguenots
Military personnel from Bordeaux